Hansschlegelia zhihuaiae is a Gram-negative and aerobic bacterium species from the genus of Hansschlegelia which has been isolated from polluted farmland soil in the Jiangsu Province in China.

References

Further reading

External links
Type strain of Hansschlegelia zhihuaiae at BacDive -  the Bacterial Diversity Metadatabase

Methylocystaceae
Bacteria described in 2011